Abdur Rashid Mandal is an Indian politician. He was elected to the Assam Legislative Assembly from Goalpara West in the 2016 and 2021 Assam Legislative Assembly election as a member of the Indian National Congress. He previously served from 2006 to 2011.

References

Indian National Congress politicians from Assam
Living people
Year of birth missing (living people)
People from Goalpara district